Rupeni Nasiga (born 8 October 1985) is a Fijian rugby union footballer. He currently plays for the Nadroga rugby team and the Fiji national rugby union team and usually plays as a lock. 
He was part of the Fiji team at the 2011 Rugby World Cup where he played in two matches, he made his international debut in 2008.

References

External links

1985 births
Living people
Fijian rugby union players
Fiji international rugby union players
Fijian expatriate rugby union players
Fijian expatriate sportspeople in New Zealand
Fijian expatriate sportspeople in England
Counties Manukau rugby union players
Plymouth Albion R.F.C. players
Rugby union locks
People from Sigatoka
I-Taukei Fijian people